American Exorcist: Critical Essays on William Peter Blatty (2008) is an anthology of essays studying all of William Peter Blatty's novels, from Which Way to Mecca, Jack? (1959) to Elsewhere (2009).

Contents

"So Much Mystery...": The Fiction of William Peter Blatty by Scott D. Briggs
Lebanon, the Fightin' Irish, and Billy Shakespeare: The Comic Novels of William Peter Blatty by John Goodrich
Fear of the Assimilation of the Foreign Other in The Exorcist by Philip L. Simpson
A Devil for the Day: William Peter Blatty, Ira Levin, and the Revision of the Satanic by John Langan
The Horror of The Exorcist: Its Presentation and Confrontation by J. W. Ocker
Some Thoughts on The Ninth Configuration by Henrik Sandbeck Harksen
Twinkle, Twinkle, "Killer" Kane! and The Ninth Configuration: A Comparison by Ryan Streat
"Foot, You Are Wise!": The Apologetic Structure of The Ninth Configuration by Geoffrey Reiter
The Exorcist and Legion: Religious Horrors by Tim Kroenert
The Devilish God: William Peter Blatty's Legion and the Problem of Evil by James Doig
Demons Five, Exorcists Nothing: A Fable: The Theo-Illogical, Semi-Autobiographical Epic Film That Never Was by Michael Garrett
It Ain't Over Till the Fat Lady Sings: William Peter Blatty's Elsewhere and the Haunted House Formula by Davide Mana
The Exegesis of William Peter Blatty: Catholicism, Exorcism & Pazuzu by Benjamin Szumskyj

External links
AmericanExorcist.TheNinthConfiguration.com - Official micro-site promoting the book
Interview with Benjamin Szumskyj
McFarland Publishing

2008 non-fiction books
2008 anthologies
Essay anthologies
The Exorcist
Books of literary criticism
Essays in literary criticism